Retinoic acid receptor responder protein 1 is a protein that in humans is encoded by the RARRES1 gene.

This gene was identified as a retinoid acid (RA) receptor-responsive gene. It encodes a type 1 membrane protein. The expression of this gene is upregulated by tazarotene as well as by retinoic acid receptors. The expression of this gene is found to be downregulated in prostate cancer, which is caused by the methylation of its promoter and CpG island. Alternatively spliced transcript variant encoding distinct isoforms have been observed.

References

Further reading